UFC Fight Night: Andrade vs. Zhang (also known as UFC Fight Night 157 or UFC on ESPN+ 15) was a mixed martial arts event produced by the Ultimate Fighting Championship that took place on August 31, 2019 at Shenzhen Universiade Sports Centre Arena in Shenzhen, China.

Background
The event marked the promotion's first visit to Shenzhen.

A UFC Women's Strawweight Championship bout between former champion Jéssica Andrade and Zhang Weili served as the event's headliner.

A flyweight bout between Luana Carolina and Wu Yanan had been rescheduled and was expected to take place at the event. The pairing was first scheduled to take place at UFC 237. However, Yanan pulled out of the bout due to injury and was replaced by Priscila Cachoeira. In turn, Carolina suffered a fractured spine and was forced to pull out of the event. She was replaced by Mizuki Inoue. At the weigh-ins, Yanan weighed in at 129 pounds, 3 pounds over the flyweight non-title fight limit of 126. As a result, she was fined 30 percent of her purse and the bout proceeded at a catchweight.

A welterweight bout between Li Jingliang and Elizeu Zaleski dos Santos was initially scheduled to take place in November 2018 at UFC Fight Night: Blaydes vs. Ngannou 2. However, Santos pulled out of the contest due to a knee injury and was replaced by David Zawada. The pairing was rescheduled for this event.

A light heavyweight bout between Saparbek Safarov and Da Un Jung was scheduled for the event. However, on August 5, it was announced that Safarov withdrew from the event due to undisclosed reasons and he was replaced by Jamahal Hill. In turn, Hill was forced to withdraw from the card due to visa issues. Jung instead faced Khadis Ibragimov.

A featherweight bout between Movsar Evloev and Mike Grundy was scheduled for the event. However, on August 19, it was reported that Grundy was forced to pull out of the event citing injury. He was replaced by promotional newcomer Lu Zhenhong. The pairing met previously in 2015 under M-1 Global with Evloev winning a decision. Subsequently, the bout was scrapped from the event as Lu suffered a cut during a sparring session after the weigh-ins and was ruled out of the fight by medical personnel.

Results

Bonus awards
The following fighters received $50,000 bonuses.
Fight of the Night: Alateng Heili vs. Danaa Batgerel
Performance of the Night: Zhang Weili and Li Jingliang

See also 

 List of UFC events
 2019 in UFC
 List of current UFC fighters

References 

UFC Fight Night
2019 in mixed martial arts
2019 in Chinese sport
Mixed martial arts in China
Sport in Shenzhen
August 2019 sports events in China
Sports competitions in Guangdong